The following lists events in the year 2016 in Iceland.

Incumbents
 President - Ólafur Ragnar Grímsson
 Prime Minister - Sigmundur Davíð Gunnlaugsson (until 7 April), Sigurður Ingi Jóhannsson (from 7 April)

Events

April
 April 4 - Anti-government protests begin in Reykjavik in response to allegations that Prime Minister Gunnlaugsson was attempting to hide millions of dollars in investments according to tax documents in the Panama Papers.
April 5 - Prime Minister Gunnlaugsson resigns over allegations of his family's involvement in the Panama Papers.

Deaths
29 January – Ragnhildur Helgadóttir, politician (born 1930).
14 July – Kristín Halldórsdóttir, politician (born 1939).

See also
Iceland at the 2016 Summer Olympics

References

 
2010s in Iceland
Years of the 21st century in Iceland
Iceland
Iceland